Ricky López (born March 3, 1987) is an American professional boxer who fights in the super bantamweight weight class.

Professional career
On May 9, 2009 López took out the veteran Nick Arellano by K.O. to win his professional debut.

See also
Notable boxing families

References

External links

American boxers of Mexican descent
Boxers from California
Super-bantamweight boxers
1987 births
Living people
American male boxers